The Case River is a tributary of the Kabika River, flowing in Cochrane District in Northeastern Ontario, in Canada. The course of this river runs through the townships of Steele, Case and Kenning.

Forestry is the main economic activity of the sector; recreational tourism activities, second. The west side of this slope is served by the Ontario road 652.

The surface of the river is usually frozen from early November to mid-May, but safe circulation on the ice generally occurs from mid-November to the end of April.

Geography 
The surrounding hydrographic slopes of the Case River are:
North side: Kabika River, Burntbush River;
Nast side: Kabika River, East Kabika River, Patten River, Turgeon River;
South side: Mace Creek, Abitibi Lake, Little Kaminisinakwa River;
West side: Little Joe Creek, Kenning River, Séguin River.

The Case River originates at the mouth of Wheat Lake in northern Steele Township.

From the mouth of Wheat Lake, the Case River flows over  according to the following segments:
 northwesterly in Steele Township, to the east of Case Township;
 north in Case Township, to Kenning's Anton Line;
 northwesterly in Kenning Township, to the influence of the Kenning River (coming from the west);
 north, then north-east, winding through township Hurtubise to its mouth.

Toponymy 
The term "Case" is a family name of English origin.

See also 

Kenning River, a watercourse
Kabika River, a watercourse
Burntbush River, a watercourse
Turgeon River, a stream
Harricana River, a watercourse
James Bay
Cochrane District (Ontario)
Northeastern Ontario
List of rivers of Ontario

References

External links 

Rivers of Cochrane District